HD 161988, also known as HR 6635, is a solitary, orange hued star located in the southern circumpolar constellation Apus. It has an apparent magnitude of 6.07, allowing it to be faintly visible to the naked eye.

The object has a stellar classification of K2 III, indicating that it is a red giant. Gaia Data Release 3 models place it on the red giant branch. HD 161988 has an iron abundance 74% that of the Sun, making it slightly metal deficient.

References

External links
 Image HD 161988

Apus (constellation)
161988
K-type giants
6635
087926
CD-76 00919
Double stars
Apodis, 63